is a mountain located between Kitaaiki and Minamiaiki Villages, Minamisaku District, Nagano Prefecture, Japan.  With its summit being 2,112 meters above sea level, it is the tallest mountain in Minamiaiki, Nagano.

It is known for the Japanese rhododendron flowers (shakunage in Japanese) that come into full bloom in early to mid-June.

External links
  From the official site of Minamiaiki Village (in Japanese)

Mountains of Nagano Prefecture